General Donald Raymond Keith (January 31, 1927 – September 9, 2004) was a United States Army general.

Early life and education
Keith was born in Ludington, Michigan. During World War II, he served in the United States Army as an enlisted soldier. He graduated from the United States Military Academy at West Point in 1949 and was commissioned a field artillery second lieutenant. He received his bachelor's degree from the Academy and a master's degree from Columbia University in 1958, preceding a faculty assignment at West Point. He received an honorary Doctor of Laws Degree from the University of Akron in 1982.

Military career
Some of Keith's key duty assignments in his active military service were:

January 69 to July 70 – Commander, 36th Artillery Group, United States Army, Europe
July 70 to June 71 – Executive Officer, Office of the Chief of Research and Development, United States Army, Washington, D.C.
August 71 to August 72 – Director, Research and Analysis Directorate, Civil Operations and Revolutionary Development Support, United States Military Assistance Command, Vietnam
September 72 to May 74 – Director of Developments, Office, Chief of Research and Development, United States Army, Washington, D.C.
May 74 to October 76 – Director of Weapon Systems, Office, Deputy Chief of Staff for Research, Development and Acquisition, United States Army, Washington, D.C.
October 76 to October 77 – Commanding General, United States Army Field Artillery School, Fort Sill, Oklahoma
October 77 to December 77 – Acting Deputy Chief of Staff for Research, Development and Acquisition, United States Army, Washington, D.C.
December 77 to August 81 – Deputy Chief of Staff for Research, Development and Acquisition, United States Army, Washington, D.C.
August 81 to June 84 – Commanding General, United States Army Materiel Development and Readiness Command, Alexandria, Virginia

Keith attended the Ground General School, Field Artillery School, Command and General Staff College, Armed Forces Staff College, and Industrial College of the Armed Forces. He was awarded the Army Distinguished Service Medal, the Legion of Merit with two Oak Leaf Clusters, the Bronze Star Medal, the Army Commendation Medal with Oak Leaf Cluster and numerous foreign awards and service ribbons. He retired from military service on June 28, 1984.

Later life
In retirement Keith served as Chairman of the United States Field Artillery Association, from 2002 until shortly before his death, and was succeeded by Jack N. Merritt. He died September 9, 2004. He is buried at Arlington National Cemetery.

References

1927 births
2004 deaths
United States Army generals
United States Military Academy alumni
Recipients of the Legion of Merit
United States Army personnel of the Vietnam War
People from Ludington, Michigan
Military personnel from Michigan
Columbia University alumni
Burials at Arlington National Cemetery
United States Army Command and General Staff College alumni
Dwight D. Eisenhower School for National Security and Resource Strategy alumni